National Route 54 is a national highway of Japan connecting Naka-ku, Hiroshima and Matsue, Shimane.

Route data
Length: 174.5 km (108.43 mi).

References

054
Roads in Hiroshima Prefecture
Roads in Shimane Prefecture